Satyanweshi Byomkesh is a  2019 Bengali detective thriller featuring the iconic sleuth Byomkesh, played by Parambrata Chatterjee. The role of Ajit is played by Rudranil Ghosh and Henna Mullick is played by Ayoshi Talukdar. The film is a murder mystery directed by Sayantan Ghosal, produced by Greentouch Entertainment and bankrolled by Shyam Sundar Dey and Tanmoy Banerjee based on the story "Magna Mainak" by Saradindu Bandhopadhyay. The film released on 2 October 2019. A sequel titled Durgo Rahasya is announced.

Cast 
 Parambrata Chatterjee as Byomkesh 
 Rudranil Ghosh as Ajit 
 Gargee Roy Chowdhury
 Anjan Dutt as Robi
 Suprobhat Das
 Ayoshi Talukdar as Henna Mallick
 Madhurima Basak
 Soumendra Bhattacharya
 Tribikram Ghosh 
 Arghya Roy 
 Abhijit Saha 
 Sumanta Mukherjee
 Swaroopa Ghosh
 Kunal Banerjee 
 Subrata Ganguly
 Ananya Guha
 Manav Sachdev
 Dipak Das
 Pannalal Ghosh
 Sanju Dutta

Marketing and release
The first-look poster of the movie was released on 26 August 2019. The official teaser was launched by Greentouch Entertainment on 1 September 2019.

The film was theatrically released on 2 October 2019, coinciding with the Durga Puja holidays.

References

External links
 

2019 films
Bengali-language Indian films
2010s Bengali-language films
Indian detective films
Byomkesh Bakshi
Byomkesh Bakshi films
Films directed by Sayantan Ghosal
Films based on works by Saradindu Bandopadhyay